Hubert Léonard (7 April 1819 – 6 May 1890) was a famous Belgian violinist, born in Liège. His earliest preparatory training was given by a prominent teacher of the time, after which he entered the Paris Conservatoire in 1836. There he studied for three years under François Antoine Habeneck. In 1844 he started his extended tours which established his reputation as one of the greatest of virtuosos. From 1848 to 1867 he held the position of principal professor of violin playing at the Brussels Conservatoire, having succeeded the celebrated Charles de Bériot. Owing to ill health, he resigned and settled in Paris, where he spent the rest of his life, and where he gave lessons. Among his notable students were Alfred De Sève, Martin Pierre Marsick, Henri Marteau, Henry Schradieck, and César Thomson. He wrote a significant pedagogical work entitled Ecole Léonard.

Sources

External links

1819 births
1890 deaths
Belgian classical composers
Belgian male classical composers
Romantic composers
Belgian classical violinists
Musicians from Liège
19th-century classical composers
19th-century classical violinists
Male classical violinists
19th-century Belgian male musicians